Franciska Kiss-Simon (born 7 November 1995) is a Hungarian ice hockey player and member of the Hungarian national team, currently playing in the European Women's Hockey League (EWHL) with the women's team of KMH Budapest.

She represented Hungary at the 2021 IIHF Women's World Championship.

Career statistics

International

Source(s):

References

External links
 

1995 births
Living people
Fakel Chelyabinsk players
Hungarian expatriate sportspeople in Russia
Hungarian women's ice hockey defencemen
KMH Budapest (women) players
HC SKIF players
Sportspeople from Budapest